Fall Guy may refer to:

 Fall guy, a person to whom blame is attributed to deflect responsibility from another party
 The Fall Guy, a 1980s American television series
 The Fall Guy (video game), a video game based on the 1980s television series
 The Fall Guy (2024 film), an upcoming American action film based on the 1980s television series
 The Fall Guy (1913 film), an American film produced by The Foster Photoplay Company
 The Fall Guy (1921 film), an American silent comedy
 The Fall Guy (1930 film), an American crime drama
 Fall Guy (1947 film), an American film noir
 The Fall Guy (1965 film), an industrial film short for U.S. Steel starring Buster Keaton
 Fall Guy (1982 film), a Japanese film
 Fallguy, a 1962 American film
Fall Guys, a 2020 platformer battle royale video game developed by Mediatonic